Jalalabad (also Romanized as Jalālābād; also known as ‘Alīābād) is a village in Sadeqiyeh Rural District, in the Central District of Najafabad County, Isfahan Province, Iran. At the 2006 census, its population was 4,950, in 1100 families.

References 

Populated places in Najafabad County